Antoine Michel is a French actor. 

Originating from Paris, France, Michel has been featured in commercials and magazine ads since he was five. As a teenager, he toured all of France in various theatre companies.

His breakthrough role came in 2002 in Fabrice Cazeneuve's film You'll Get Over It.

Antoine, now works regularly in films and TV series mostly in France.

He is best known for playing intense characters like the boxer in  You'll Get Over It, the Jihadist in L'Equilibre de la Terreur or the psychopath in Meurtres à Rocamadour.

Filmography
2002 You'll Get Over It by Fabrice Cazeneuve : Régis Molina
2004 Péril Imminent: Mortel Chahut  by Arnaud Sélignac : the big master
2006 L'Equilibre de la Terreur  by Jean-Martial Lefranc : Gérard-Ahmed Assam
2008 Et + si @ff (en tout bien, tout bonheur)  de Paul Vecchiali : Philippe Dessaix
2010 The Names of Love de Michel Leclerc : the photographer
2010 Une famille formidable de Joel Santoni : the model
2010 Profilage (série télévisée)  épisode l'age sombre : Antoine Chassagne
2010 Gossip girl : Serena's French date
2011  Poupoupidou by Gérald Hustache-Mathieu ; fireman
2013 Dernier recours épisode "Dangereuses visions" de Adeline Darraux : Rémi de Martignac
2014  Meurtres à Rocamadour de Lionel Bailliu : Olivier Granville
2014  Piste Noire by Jalil Naciri  ; Paul
2015 : Toute première fois de Maxime Govare, Noémie Saglio : ami d'Antoine
2016 : Plus belle la vie : Cédric Watt (13 épisodes)
2016 : Les Mystères de l'amour : Adrien Nabette
2016 : The Bureau (TV series) : le technicien de la DT
2017 : Agathe Koltès : Tristan Wichniak
2019 : Balthazar (TV series) : Mr Tissandier
2020 : Le Réseau Shelburn de Nicolas Guillou : Raymond Labrosse
2020 : Alice Nevers: Le juge est une femme : Jean-Noël Normand (2épisodes)

External links
 Antoine Michel on the Internet Movie Database

Year of birth missing (living people)
Living people
French male film actors
French male child actors
Male actors from Paris